Edgerton is a town in Natrona County, Wyoming, United States. It is part of the Casper, Wyoming Metropolitan Statistical Area.  The population was 195 at the 2010 census.

Geography
Edgerton is located at  (43.413368, -106.249775).

Demographics

2010 census
As of the census of 2010, there were 195 people, 90 households, and 48 families living in the town. The racial makeup of the town was 94.4% White, 0.5% African American, 0.5% Native American, and 4.6% from two or more races. Hispanic or Latino of any race were 5.6% of the population.

There were 90 households, of which 20.0% had children under the age of 18 living with them, 40.0% were married couples living together, 12.2% had a female householder with no husband present, 1.1% had a male householder with no wife present, and 46.7% were non-families. 40.0% of all households were made up of individuals, and 15.5% had someone living alone who was 65 years of age or older. The average household size was 2.17 and the average family size was 2.85.

The median age in the town was 49.1 years. 17.9% of residents were under the age of 18; 7.7% were between the ages of 18 and 24; 19% were from 25 to 44; 39.5% were from 45 to 64; and 15.9% were 65 years of age or older. The gender makeup of the town was 55.9% male and 44.1% female.

2000 census
As of the census of 2000, there were 169 people, 74 households, and 44 families living in the town. The population density was 655.4 people per square mile (251.0/km2). There were 119 housing units at an average density of 461.5 per square mile (176.7/km2). The racial makeup of the town was 96.45% White, 0.59% Native American, 1.18% from other races, and 1.78% from two or more races. Hispanic or Latino of any race were 1.18% of the population.

There were 74 households, out of which 27.0% had children under the age of 18 living with them, 51.4% were married couples living together, 8.1% had a female householder with no husband present, and 39.2% were non-families. 36.5% of all households were made up of individuals, and 8.1% had someone living alone who was 65 years of age or older. The average household size was 2.28 and the average family size was 2.96.

In the town, the population was spread out, with 23.7% under the age of 18, 4.7% from 18 to 24, 24.3% from 25 to 44, 36.1% from 45 to 64, and 11.2% who were 65 years of age or older. The median age was 43 years. For every 100 females, there were 119.5 males. For every 100 females age 18 and over, there were 118.6 males.

The median income for a household in the town was $28,750, and the median income for a family was $33,750. Males had a median income of $24,583 versus $14,375 for females. The per capita income for the town was $14,332. About 10.7% of families and 18.2% of the population were below the poverty line, including 9.1% of those under the age of eighteen and none of those 65 or over.

Education
Public education in the town of Edgerton is provided by Natrona County School District #1.

Edgerton has a public library, a branch of the Natrona County Public Library System.

References

Towns in Natrona County, Wyoming
Towns in Wyoming